Vivekananda Nagar is a suburb of Mysore City in Karnataka state, India.

Economy
Vivekananda Nagar is a densely populated area with many shops and commercial centres.  There is a big bus station called Kuvempunagar bus depot near the Vivekananda Circle.  Prominent residential colonies like the L.I.C. Colony and the S.B.M. Colony are also near the Vivekananda Circle.

Community Life
This town becomes very lively in the evenings because a large number of hawkers and vendors crowd here.

Tourist attractions
The scenic Lingam Budhi lake is near this place.

Residential Layouts
The adjacent residential locations are Rama Krishna nagar, Kuvempu nagar,B.E.M.L. Nagar, Sri Ram Pura and R.M.P.Colony.

See also
 Ramakrishna Nagar
 Kuvempu Nagar
 Srirampur
 Lingam Budhi Lake
 Lingam Budhi Park

References

Mysore South
Suburbs of Mysore